Nalge Company was founded in 1949 by chemist Emanuel Goldberg of Rochester, New York. The company merged with Nunc A/S in 1995 to form Nalge Nunc International

References

Manufacturing companies based in Rochester, New York